Leunino is a rural locality (a village) in Argunovskoye Rural Settlement, Nikolsky District, Vologda Oblast, Russia. The population was 19 as of 2002.

Geography 
Leunino is located 48 km northwest of Nikolsk (the district's administrative centre) by road. Nikolskoye is the nearest rural locality.

References 

Rural localities in Nikolsky District, Vologda Oblast